The National Prize for Musical Arts was created in Chile in 1992 under Law 19169 as one of the replacements of the National Prize of Art. It is granted "to the person who has distinguished himself by his achievements in the respective area of the arts" (Article 8 of the aforementioned law). It is part of the National Prize of Chile.

The prize, which is awarded every two years, consists of a diploma, the sum of 6,576,457 pesos which is adjusted every year, according to the previous year's consumer price index, and a pension of 20  (approximately US$1,600).

Winners
 1992, Juan Orrego-Salas
 1994, Margot Loyola
 1996, 
 1998, 
 2000, 
 2002, Fernando García
 2004, Cirilo Vila
 2006, Fernando Rosas Pfingsthorn
 2008, 
 2010, Carmen Luisa Letelier
 2012, 
 2014, Leon Schidlowsky
 2016, Vicente Bianchi
 2018, Juan Allende-Blin
 2020, Miryam Singer
 2022, Elisa Avendaño Curaqueo

References

1992 establishments in Chile
Awards established in 1992
Chilean awards
South American music awards
1992 in Chilean law